Pukeatua is a rural farming community in Waipa District and Waikato region of New Zealand's North Island. It is situated at the south-western foot of the Pukeatua hill, of the Maungatautari mountain range.

The area is west of Tīrau, Putāruru and State Highway 1, and east of Te Awamutu and State Highway 3.

Pukeatua translates as hill of god (puke = hill, atua= god).

Demographics
The SA1 area is part of the larger Rotongata statistical area.

The SA1 area had a population of 165 at the 2018 New Zealand census, an increase of 3 people (1.9%) since the 2013 census, and an increase of 30 people (22.2%) since the 2006 census. There were 60 households, comprising 84 males and 78 females, giving a sex ratio of 1.08 males per female. The median age was 37.6 years (compared with 37.4 years nationally), with 42 people (25.5%) aged under 15 years, 18 (10.9%) aged 15 to 29, 90 (54.5%) aged 30 to 64, and 12 (7.3%) aged 65 or older.

Ethnicities were 78.2% European/Pākehā, 14.5% Māori, 3.6% Pacific peoples, 14.5% Asian, and 3.6% other ethnicities. People may identify with more than one ethnicity.

Although some people chose not to answer the census's question about religious affiliation, 45.5% had no religion, 41.8% were Christian, 3.6% had Māori religious beliefs, 1.8% were Buddhist and 5.5% had other religions.

Of those at least 15 years old, 27 (22.0%) people had a bachelor's or higher degree, and 21 (17.1%) people had no formal qualifications. The median income was $40,300, compared with $31,800 nationally. 24 people (19.5%) earned over $70,000 compared to 17.2% nationally. The employment status of those at least 15 was that 72 (58.5%) people were employed full-time, 30 (24.4%) were part-time, and 3 (2.4%) were unemployed.

Rotongata statistical area

Rotongata had a population of 834 at the 2018 New Zealand census, an increase of 15 people (1.8%) since the 2013 census, and an increase of 12 people (1.5%) since the 2006 census. There were 294 households, comprising 423 males and 411 females, giving a sex ratio of 1.03 males per female. The median age was 34.2 years (compared with 37.4 years nationally), with 222 people (26.6%) aged under 15 years, 141 (16.9%) aged 15 to 29, 408 (48.9%) aged 30 to 64, and 60 (7.2%) aged 65 or older.

Ethnicities were 77.7% European/Pākehā, 19.4% Māori, 1.8% Pacific peoples, 9.0% Asian, and 2.5% other ethnicities. People may identify with more than one ethnicity.

The percentage of people born overseas was 16.9, compared with 27.1% nationally.

Although some people chose not to answer the census's question about religious affiliation, 52.5% had no religion, 34.2% were Christian, 2.2% had Māori religious beliefs, 0.4% were Hindu, 1.1% were Buddhist and 2.5% had other religions.

Of those at least 15 years old, 132 (21.6%) people had a bachelor's or higher degree, and 102 (16.7%) people had no formal qualifications. The median income was $38,100, compared with $31,800 nationally. 93 people (15.2%) earned over $70,000 compared to 17.2% nationally. The employment status of those at least 15 was that 384 (62.7%) people were employed full-time, 105 (17.2%) were part-time, and 12 (2.0%) were unemployed.

Education

Pukeatua School is a Decile 8 primary school, providing full education for Years 1 to 8. The school was founded in 1911.

The village also has a small war memorial church and a playcentre.

References

Waipa District
Populated places in Waikato